Outtrim North was a railway station on the Outtrim railway line in South Gippsland, Victoria, Australia. The station opened with the Jumbunna to Outtrim extension on 5 February 1896, and was one of only three on the Outtrim branch. The station was closed on 4 September 1951.

Disused railway stations in Victoria (Australia)
Transport in Gippsland (region)
Shire of South Gippsland